Leona Dombrowsky (born April 29, 1957) is a Canadian former politician in Ontario, Canada. She was a Liberal member of the Legislative Assembly of Ontario from 1999 to 2011 who represented the ridings of Hastings—Frontenac—Lennox and Addington and Prince Edward—Hastings. She served as a cabinet minister in the government of Premier Dalton McGuinty.

Background
Dombrowsky was born in Belleville, Ontario and received a Bachelor of Arts degree from the University of Toronto in 1979. She was elected as a Catholic School trustee on the Hastings-Prince Edward Separate School Board in 1985, and served as its Chair from 1991 to 1996. In 1998, she was elected to the amalgamated Algonquin-Lakeshore Catholic District School Board. She was also a Director of the Ontario Catholic Trustees Association during this period, and served on the Tweed Parks & Recreation Committee from 1991 to 1997. As of 2012, she served as a justice of the peace.

Politics
Dombrowsky was elected to the Ontario legislature in the provincial election of 1999, as a Liberal in the rural riding of Hastings—Frontenac—Lennox and Addington (which surrounds the city of Kingston, Ontario) defeating incumbent Progressive Conservative Harry Danford by about 2,000 votes.   The election was won by the Progressive Conservatives; despite her lack of experience, Dombrowsky soon emerged as a prominent voice in the opposition benches, serving as Official Opposition Critic for Community, Family and Children's Services and Deputy House Leader.

The Liberals won the provincial election of 2003, and Dombrowsky was re-elected by about 8,000 votes over her Progressive Conservative opponent.  On October 23, 2003, she was appointed Minister of the Environment.  In this capacity, she was responsible for overseeing changes to the province's water supply system (the safety of which was called into question after a tragic outbreak of e-coli in Walkerton, Ontario).  Dombrowsky's ministry hired more full-time water inspectors and also called for the phasing out of coal-fired electrical generating plants.

On June 29, 2005 Dombrowsky became Minister of Agriculture, Food and Rural Affairs.  On January 18, 2010, Dombrowsky was named Minister of Education.

In the 2011 election, she lost her seat to Progressive Conservative Todd Smith.

Cabinet positions

Electoral record

References

External links

1957 births
Women government ministers of Canada
Living people
Members of the Executive Council of Ontario
Ontario Liberal Party MPPs
Politicians from Belleville, Ontario
University of Toronto alumni
Women MPPs in Ontario
21st-century Canadian politicians
21st-century Canadian women politicians
Ontario school board trustees